Potamotrygon orbignyi, the smooth back river stingray, is a species of river stingray in the family Potamotrygonidae. It is found in the Amazon and Orinoco River basins in South America.

Etymology
 The genus name Potamotrygon comes from the Greek words potamos (river) and trygon (sting ray).
The species name is in honor of Alcide Charles Victor Marie Dessalines d'Orbigny.

References

orbignyi
Freshwater fish of Brazil
Freshwater fish of Colombia
Fish of French Guiana
Fish of Guyana
Fish of Suriname
Fish of Venezuela
Fish of the Amazon basin
Fish described in 1855
Taxa named by François-Louis Laporte, comte de Castelnau